Exils is a 2004 French film by Tony Gatlif. The film follows two young bohemians, Zano and Naima. After having sex, the two spontaneously decide that they will travel to Algeria, where Naima's parents come from, and where Zano's (Romain Duris) pied-noir parents were once exiled. Their adventurous journey to Algiers is full of character exploration, relationship hiccups and imagery. The film was also a homecoming for Gatlif himself, seeing him return to Algeria 43 years after he left.

Plot
Zano and Naima travel from France, down through Spain toward Algeria but get lost many times along the way. They work as fruit pickers for a while.

Cast and characters
 Romain Duris : Zano
 Lubna Azabal : Naima
 Leila Makhlouf : Leila
 Habib Cheik : Habib
 Zouhir Gacem : Said

Awards
Gatlif won the award for Best Director at the 2004 Cannes Film Festival.

Music
The film features original music by Tony Gatlif and vocals by Rona Hartner, who also performed in Gatlif's movie Gadjo dilo.

References

External links

2000s Spanish-language films
2004 films
French road movies
2000s road movies
Films directed by Tony Gatlif
Films shot in Algeria
Films shot in Almería
2000s French films